The 1967–68 Montreal Canadiens season was the club's 59th season of play. The Canadiens won their 15th Stanley Cup in club history.

Offseason

Expansion draft
The 1967 NHL Expansion Draft was held on June 6, 1967, in the ballroom of the Queen Elizabeth Hotel in Montreal. The Canadiens lost 18 players in the NHL Expansion Draft. General manager Sam Pollock helped Clarence Campbell draw up the rules for the draft. The most notable players lost were Charlie Hodge, Jean-Guy Talbot, Dave Balon and Jim Roberts.

Regular season
On March 3, 1968, Jean Beliveau joined Gordie Howe as the only players to have 1000 career points.

Final standings

Record vs. opponents

Schedule and results

Playoffs

Stanley Cup finals
This was the first Stanley Cup after the 1967 expansion. Montreal defeated Boston and Chicago to advance to the finals as the East Division champion. St. Louis would defeat Philadelphia and Minnesota to advance to the finals as the West Division champion.

Montreal wins the series 4–0.

Player statistics

Regular season
Scoring

Goaltending

Playoffs
Scoring

Goaltending

Awards and records
 Prince of Wales Trophy.
 Jean Beliveau, runner-up, Hart Trophy.
 Claude Provost, Bill Masterton Memorial Trophy.
 J. C. Tremblay, defence, NHL Second Team All-Star.
 J. C. Tremblay, runner-up, Norris Trophy.
 Rogie Vachon and Gump Worsley, Vezina Trophy.
 Gump Worsley, goaltender, NHL First Team All-Star.

Transactions

Draft picks
Montreal's draft picks at the 1967 NHL Amateur Draft held at the Queen Elizabeth Hotel in Montreal, Quebec.

See also
1967–68 NHL season
List of Stanley Cup champions

References

Notes

Bibliography
National Hockey League Official Guide and Record Book 2006, Dan Diamond & Associates, Toronto, Ontario, .

External links
Canadiens on Hockey Database
Canadiens on NHL Reference

Montreal Canadiens seasons
Mon
Mon
Stanley Cup championship seasons
Mon